Santhwanam is an Indian Malayalam-language soap opera directed by Aadithyan. The show premiered on 21 September 2020 on Asianet and aires on-demand through Disney+ Hotstar. It stars Rajeev Parameshwar, Chippy Renjith, Girish Nambiar, Raksha Raj, Sajin TP, Gopika Anil, Achu Sugandh and Manjusha Martin in lead roles. It is an official remake of Tamil soap opera Pandian Stores, airing on Star Vijay.

Plot
Krishnan and Lakshmi run a grocery store, Krishna Stores, in a town named Ambalathara. Lakshmi's brother, Shankaran forces Krishnan into financial difficulty and causes Krishnan to suicide. Balan, the eldest son, marries Devi, who looks after Lakshmi and his brothers (Hari, Shivan, and Kannan).

Shankaran pressures Lakshmi to agree to an arranged marriage between his daughter, Anjali, and Hari. Hari refuses because he is in love with his college friend Aparna. Devi asks Balan to convince Appu to leave Hari, but he refuses. Devi secretly visits Appu's father Thampi, who gets offended and beats her, which causes Hari to accept the marriage proposal. Appu creates a scene in the wedding hall, leaving the relationships between the two families strained.mTo save the family's reputation, Devi decides that Shivan should marry Anju. Eventually, Hari marries Appu and Shivan marries Anju, but Devi is criticized for what is seen as a poor match. Appu and Hari fight over money until she adjusts to the lifestyle at Santhwanam.

Thampi sees Kannan escorting Appu's younger sister Ammu back home, and assaults him. Kannan tells his brothers about this, who confront Thampi and have a physical altercation. Thampi stops sending goods to Krishna Stores. As a result, there occurs a rapid shortage of goods at the shop.

Shiva and Anjali go to a relative's wedding. On their way back home, they get into an accident when someone hits their bike. Shiva and Anju tell Balan and Hari that the accident was intentional. Savitri blames Shiva for the accident, saying that it is because they did not give enough dowry he pushed Anju intentionally off the bike. Hari discovers that the man that hit Shiva and Anju's bike was one of Thampi's men. Jayanthi overhears the brothers' conversation and blames Appu for the accident, exposing the truth to the whole family, and Lakshmi orders Appu out of the house. She leaves, and Balan and Hari find her in Amaravathy and bring her back. Balan scolds Appu for leaving Santhwanam, and she replies that she went away to warn him to not hurt the family again.

Appu wants to go on a honeymoon, but she travels with the whole family except Balan and Lakshmi. At home, Savitri and Shankaran take care of Lakshmi and the business, respectively, but Savitri forgets to give medicine to Lakshmi. When the rest of the family returns they express their disgust at Savitri's behaviour.

Later on, Kannan's friends cheat him and he is arrested by police. Shiva and Hari find the real culprit and make him confess to Appu's cousin, freeing him from police custody.

Thambi pretends to be friendly with Hari and Appu and gifts them clothes. Hari is suspicious as Balan had been warned by Thambi that he will separate Hari from the former. Hari escapes from Thambi's house, but is sent back by Balan. Appu yells at Hari for leaving the house.

Jaganathan comes to Sankaran's house and demands that sankaran return his loans. Shiva takes him out for a compromise but he suggests that if Sankaran can't pay his loans then the former can send the ladies inside (Anjali, Jayanthi and Savitri) with the latter. An enraged Shiva slaps Jagannatan. Thambi manipulates Jagannathan against Shiva and Jagannathan registers a complaint against shiva. Shiva is arrested by the police and assaulted in front of Anjali and Savithri in the station. Later, Thambi requests Jagan to withdraw his complaint but Balan and Sethu assault him in his home the same night.

Thambi now sends his younger sister Rajalakshmi aka "Lachu" from Bangalore to Santhwanam family to disrupt the peaceful family. She creates rifts between Appu, Anjali and Kannan. She buys a new bed, stove, and washing machine to divide the family. Balan and Devi get suspicious of her and start doubting her. Lachu makes vile remarks against Kannan and Anju gets enraged. One day Kannan puts his clothes in the washing machine to wash them. Lachu sees this and throws his clothes with disgust. Anjali speaks angrily with Lachu because of her behaviour and splashes soap water on her face when she comes to threaten her. Lachu fabricates a new story and tells Appu of this. Appu and Anju fight with each other. Soon Appu overhears Lachu's plans and ousts the latter with all the appliances she bought. Thambi and Lachu get offended and Lachu leaves for Bangalore after threatening him of telling his elder sister Rajeshwari about his deeds. Soon Devi buys a new washing machine and Kannan inaugurates it.

Since Shiva is not well educated so he asks Kannan about online payments. Kannan mocks him and Appu also joins unintentionally. Anjali is hurt by their remarks and chides Shiva for being bothered only about the shop and not about the rapidly changing outside world.

After Lachu leaves, she calls Rajeshwari and informs about Thampi's play in their ancestral temple. Rajeshwari after knowing this rings up Thampi and questions about the same. Meanwhile Santhwanam regains it's lost happiness back.

Rajeshwari makes a sudden visit to Amaravati(the ancestral home) on seeing her there, Thampi is in fix. Thampi shares his deeds about bringing Hari to Amaravati since he is educated unlike others in Santhwanam. But Rajeshwari is unhappy about the former. After Thampi's wanting for Hari, Rajeshwari agrees on the condition that she needs Hari and Appu to stay at Amaravati for at least a week. Thampi on a belief plays an emotional act to Balan. Balan in reply tells that it was his cunning idea to trap Shivan in police custody. Later Thampi meets Shankaran and acts pleasingly to talk to Balan about his innocence. 

Jayanthi arrives at Sankaran's house and enters the kitchen to drink buttermilk. Behind that Sankaran enters and narrates the conversation with Thampi, unaware that the 'eashani Bhaada' (ref. Jayanthi). Jayanthi overhears the couple and tries to make bad remarks about Balan.

Jayanthi later visits Santhwanam and narrates the same little extra when Appu is there. Appu feels sad and goes to her room. Jayanthi for the sake of calming her makes her feel sadder and Appu falls unconscious when Devi and Anju enter her room. Meanwhile, Hari comes in and takes her to Hospital. Jayanthi forcibly enters. When they reach the hospital Jayanthi calls Thampi and informs him the same. When they arrived Jayanthi started to mock Santhwanam. But a furious Thampi lashes out at her.

Rajeshwari arrives and plays a dirty game to degrade Santhwanam. But Hari and Balan lash out. Rajeshwari feels humiliated and she visits the gynac. To enquire about abortion. The doctor gets furious but Rajeshwari blackmails her.

Later, Thampi makes a plan on Rajeshwari's ideas to get Appu to Amaravati . Ambika unaware of Rajeshwari's evil ideas supports Thampi and holds up with his decision.

Meanwhile Hari leaves with breakfast to Hospital and to his surprise he finds some stranger in the room where Appu was admitted . He calls Thampi and enquires about the same. On learning about his move to take Appu to Amaravati, he hangs the call. He informs Santhwanam about the same. Devi, Balan and Hari leave to Amaravati. Meanwhile Jayanthi reaches Amaravati on Rajeshwari's plot and says all ill stories about Santhwanam family, without leaving back a chance to taunt Devi. Rajeshwari uses this as her weapon to degrade Santhwanam. Appu becomes furious and says that her child would call Devi 'Amma' They all leave the venue.

In Santhwanam Anju and Shiva starts to live their love life. Appu, Anju and Devi finds out that it was Jayanthi's phone call that made Thampi furious to throw Shankaran and Savithri from their house.

Savithri, Shankaran and Sethu becomes furious and Slaps her . Sethu abandons Jayanthi even on Subhadramma's plea.

Later Devi, Appu and Anju talk and convinces him to take Jayanthi back home on a demand that she would ask sorry for her wrongdoings.

Rajeshwari cracks another plan to trap Hari and regain all the rights of Ancestral temple. She sends Mahendran with her goons to bring Hari. Hari refuses at the first but later goes. Rajeshwari speaks to him in a blackmailing tone and he talks back to her. Suddenly one of her goon stamps down Hari. Mahendran brings peace. When Shivan and Shathru learns about it they visit Rajeshwari in her office and insult her in front of her staff. They also leave to Amaravati, but Thampi was unaware of his sister's deeds and told them the same. But they don't trust him.

The trio reach home early and their wives smells something wrong. They say that Shivan got into an argument with a customer at Krishna Stores. But Balan tells Devi about the earlier and she worries.

Jayanthi calls Rajeshwari and asks about the new plans and she narrates about the incident with Hari and Shivan. Jayanthi on knowing this calls Appu and informs.

Appu becomes furious and leaves to Amaravati to question Rajeshwari. Rajeshwari says that she may have to garland Hari's photo to mourn him if she still continued humiliating her. Appu lashes out at her and leaves from there. While returning she spots Hari and Balan and runs to them. Suddenly she goes unconscious and she falls on the ground. They rush her to the hospital. Rajeshwari feels elated.

Devi learns about the same from Balan and lies to Anju and Lakshmiyamma. Anju finds wrong in Devi's speech and enquires in Lakshmi's absence. Anju learns that Appu's in the hospital. She hides it from Lakshmiyamma.

Devi arrives at the hospital learns about the loss of Appu's child and is devastated. Ambika bitterly cries on learning the truth. Thampi, Hari and Balan aren't able to accept the truth. Appu on knowing this goes violent. Thampi calls Rajeshwari and informs about the loss and curses her. Meanwhile a depressed Hari becomes violent and tries to harm Thampi. Shivan and calms him and takes him away.

Lakshmiyamma is worried about Appu's angry behavior and that too at this period. Unaware about Appu being hospitalized. Kannan returns from college and during their conversation he says that only Shathru was in the store. Lakshmiyamma worries because Devi told that she was going to pick Appu who is in the store. Anju unable to hide anymore tells the truth about Appu in the hospital. Lakshmiyamma is worried.

Everyone learns of the bad news. Shankaran-Savithri and Jayanthi through Rajeshwari. Savithri and Shankaran are unable to calm Appu, even others at Santhwanam. Santhwanam is sad for their loss.

Jayanthi makes a visit as if she was deeply hurt. But she wasn't. She meets Appu and tries to manipulate her into thinking that Devi was the reason why she lost her baby. Jayanthi adds that Devi is cursed and Appu should go back to her family. Appu maintains silence infront of Jayanthi. Later she tells everyone what Jayanthi told her. All the members of Santhwanam lash out, they once again abandon Jayanthi. Appu tries to change the depressed surrounding and requests everyone to continue with their daily lives irrespective of the pregnancy termination.

Thampi worries because Ambika has decided to not eat until she meets her daughter. Ambika continues starving for two days. Thampi after two days complies with his wife and they decide to go to their daughter's house.

Shiva's friend Sumesh visits Krishna Stores, and asks to talk to Rahul, their mutual friend. They force him to visit Adimali with his wife to spend some qualitative time with his friends. On asking Balan, he agrees.

Thampi and Ambika visit. Ambika meets Appu and shares their grief.

Devi and Balan decides to leave the house for a few days for the sake of the family since they believe that they're the reason for the pregnancy termination and as long as they remain with the family bad thing will continue. But the other family members did not allow them to leave the house. Thus, Devi, Balan along with other family members moved to their hometown.

There Kannan always quarrels with a gof  in his age named Aishwarya Gopinadhan. Aishwarya was actually was their cousin but both of them weren't aware of this. When Kannan and Aishwarya understand that they were cousins, they try to build a strong relationship with each other.

Cast

Main
Rajeev Parameshwar as Balakrishnan Pillai  Balan: Devi's husband, Krishnan and Lakshmi's elder son; Hari, Shivan and Kannan's elder brother. 
Chippy Renjith as Sreedevi Balakrishnan  Devi: Balan's wife; Madhavan and Subhadra’s daughter. Hari, Shivan and Kannan's sister-in-law and mother-figure.
Girish Nambiar as Harikrishnan Pillai  Hari: Appu's husband, Krishnan and Lakshmi's second son; Balan's younger brother and Shivan and Kannan's elder brother.
Raksha Raj as Aparna Harikrishnan  Appu: Hari's wife, Thampi and Ambika's daughter.
Sajin T. P. as Shivaramakrishnan Pillai  Shivan: Anju's husband, Krishnan and Lakshmi's third son; Balan and Hari's younger brother and Kannan's elder brother.
Gopika Anil as Anjali Shivaramakrishnan  Anju: Shivan's wife, Shankaran and Savitri's daughter.
Achu Sugandh as Muralikrishnan Pillai  Kannan: Achu's love interest, Krishnan and Lakshmi's youngest son; Balan, Hari, Shivan's younger brother.
Manjusha Martin as Aishwarya Gopinathan  Achu: Kannan's love interest, Gopinathan and Sudha's daughter.

Recurring
Girija Preman as Lakshmi Krishnan  Lakshmiyamma: Balan, Hari, Shivan and Kannan's mother.
Yathikumar as Shivashankaran  Shankaran: Lakshmi's brother, Savithri's husband, Anjali's father.
Bijesh Avanoor as Sethu: Devi's brother, Balan's close friend and Jayanthi's husband.
Divya Binu as Malikapurackal Savithri Shivashankaran  Savitri: Shankaran's wife, Anjali's mother and Jayanthi's paternal aunt.
Apsara as Jayanthi Sethu: Sethu's wife and Savithri's niece.
Kailas Nath as Narayana Pillai  Pillai: A helper in Krishna Stores and father figure to the brothers.
Saji Surya as Shathrudharan Pillai  Shathru: Pillai's nephew.
Rohit Ved as Rajasekharan Thampi  Thampi: Ambika's husband, Rajeshwari and Rajalakshmi's brother, Appu and Ammu's father.
Rajamauli S. S. as Mahindran: Thampi's Steward.
Mohan Ayroor as Bhadran Pillai: Balan's uncle
Dr. Nita Gosh as Hemambika Rajasekharan: Thampi's wife, Appu and Ammu's mother.
Aju Thomas as Varun Bhadran Pillai
Pramod Mani as Abhishek Gopinathan: Achu's brother
Sajan Chandran as Gopinathan: Sudha's husband; Abhishek and Aishwarya's father
Sindhu Manu Varma as Sudha :Gopinathan's wife ; Aishwarya and Abhishek's mother; Krishnan and Bhadran's sister
Deepika Mohan as Lalitha: Bhadran's wife
Hareendran as Rahul: Shivan's friend
Shilpa Shaji as Malu: Rahul's wife
Renjith Renju as Sumesh: Shivan's friend
Geetha Nair as Subhadra: Devi and Sethu's mother
Zeenath as Rajeshwari: Thampi's elder sister, Appu and Ammu's aunt.
Saritha Balakrishnan as Rajalakshmi  Lachu: Thampi's younger sister, Appu and Ammu's aunt
Kalyani as Amritha Thampi  Ammu: Thampi and Ambika's daughter, Appu's younger sister
Prabha R. Krishnan as Vanaja
J. Padmanabhan Thampi as Thomachan
Mithun M. K. as Aneesh
Sreelakshmi Sreekumar as Jancy: Anju's friend
Liju Mathew Abraham as Deepu: Hari's friend

References

2020 Indian television series debuts
Malayalam-language television shows
Television shows set in Kerala
Asianet (TV channel) original programming
Malayalam-language television series based on Tamil-language television series